Henry John Andrews  (23 March 1871 – 22 October 1919) was an English recipient of the Victoria Cross, the highest award for gallantry in the face of the enemy that can be awarded to British and Commonwealth forces.

Details
Andrews was commissioned a temporary lieutenant in the Indian Medical Service as of 30 June 1917 and was promoted temporary captain as of 30 June 1918.

He was appointed a Member of the Order of the British Empire as (temporary Lieutenant), Indian Medical Service; Medical Officer in charge of the Thomas Emery Hospital at Moradabad, United Provinces in the London Gazette of 7 June 1918.

He was 48 years old, and a temporary captain in the Indian Medical Service, British Indian Army during the Waziristan Campaign when the following deed took place for which he was awarded the VC. The citation was published in a supplement to the London Gazette of 7 September 1920 (dated 9 September 1920):

He was buried in Bannu Cemetery, and is commemorated on the Delhi Memorial (India Gate).

References

External links

Burial location of Henry Andrews "Pakistan"
Salvation Army entry

British recipients of the Victoria Cross
Members of the Order of the British Empire
British people in colonial India
1871 births
1919 deaths
British military personnel of the Waziristan Campaign
Medical doctors from London
British Indian Army personnel killed in action
Indian Medical Service officers
Military personnel from London